Na dobre i na złe (For better and for worse) is a Polish television medical drama series, broadcast on TVP2 since 7 November 1999. It is the longest-running weekly primetime drama on Polish television and one of the longest-running medical dramas in the world. The show revolves around the lives of doctors and patients of a teaching hospital in a fictional town of Leśna Góra near Warsaw.

Na dobre i na złe won the "Telekamery" award for the best TV series in 2001, 2002 and 2003.

Cast members

Current cast members 
Cast members as of November 2019.

Former cast members 
Former members as of November 2019.

Awards and nominations

Characters

Hospital staff

Current threads 
 Julia Bart, born Nowak, adopted Burska (Aleksandra Hamkało) is an adopted daughter of former Leśna Góra doctors, Jakub Burski and Zofia Stankiewicz-Burska. She is an anaesthesiologist. Julia has a son, Tymon Bart, born in 2016, whose father is Artur Bart (Piotr Głowacki), a famous neurosurgeon. Julia and Artur's engagement was broken off due to Artur's addiction to painkillers and Julia's romance with Marcin Molenda. Julia married Artur on May 29, 2019 in Leśna Góra.
 Blanka Consalida (Pola Gonciarz) is a daughter of Wiktoria Consalida and her former teacher, Wojciech Sarnecki. She was born when her mother was sixteen years old and was raised as Wiktoria's sister. Blanka fell ill in 2009 and came to Poland to have a liver transplant. The only possible donor was her biological father, whom she met in September 2009. She had a liver transplantation on October 9, 2009. Blanka learnt that she was Wiktoria's daughter rather than sister but decided to come back to Spain with her legal mother. For a short time she studied photography in United States. In September 2016 she was diagnosed with osteosarcoma. During her treatment she met Maciej Kozłowski (Adam Bobik). They got engaged in April 2018. In 2017 Blanka started her studies in medicine in Bydgoszcz. Since 2019 she has her practice of gynecology in Leśna Góra, with Krzysztof Radwan as her teacher. In October 2019 her mother Wiktoria quit her job in Leśna Góra and moved permanently to Spain with her new partner, Jose.
 Andrzej Falkowicz (Michał Żebrowski) is a famous surgeon and former director of Leśna Góra hospital. His brother, Adam Krajewski, died in September 2018. Andrzej and Adam were born under the surname Baran. Their parents died ina fire of their house and Andrzej saved Adam's life. Adam was then adopted by Anna Krajewska and her husband while Andrzej was raised in an orphanage. They met again in Leśna Góra and Andrzej revealed that they were brothers. In January 2019 Falkowicz married his longtime friend, Katarzyna Smuda (Ilona Ostrowska), a lawyer and they raise Katarzyna's daughter, Matylda Smuda (Amelia Czaja). In late 2018 it was revealed that Matylda's biological father is Michał Wilczewski, a surgeon from Leśna Góra with whom Katarzyna had a romance when he was sixteen. Andrzej, Katarzyna, Michał and Matylda try to adjust to their new lives.
 Borys Jakubek (Marcin Zacharzewski) is a neurosurgeon who has worked in Leśna Góra for many years. In late 2018 he accidentally met his unknown twin brother, Jakub Grabski (Maciej Zacharzewski) who turned out to be an internist. Their mother is Barbara Wasiak (Ewa Serwa), a former nurse.
 Rafał Konica (Robert Koszucki) is an orthopaedist who works in Leśna Góra since April 2007. Konica was previously addicted from drugs and had a romance, and then relationship with Marta Kozioł, a nurse. They had three children: Jan, Małgorzata and Artur. Marta left a family a few years after the birth of their youngest child and moved to United States with her new lover. She came back in early 2016 when their daughter Małgorzata was injured in a car accident and eventually died. Rafał was at the time engaged to marry Klaudia Miller, a surgeon, but had a one-night stand with Marta. Klaudia learnt about his betrayal a few minutes before their wedding. She decided to left Leśna Góra and move to Bavaria, Germany. Rafał is now single and raises his children with the help of Marta and her mother, Irena Kozioł. He is a hospital's current director since May 2019.
 Szczepan Lipski (Kamil Kula) is a nurse and former cleaner who workes in Leśna Góra. He was previously dating Agata Woźnicka, until her department in November 2017. In October 2019 he proposed to Lina Lipska (Izabela Perez), an immigrant from Jemen, who suffers from lymphoma, to let her continue her oncological treatment in Poland. They married in a civil ceremony on December 11, 2019 and she got Polish citizenship.
 Marcin Molenda (Filip Bobek) is an anaesthesiologist who has problems because of pretending a death of one of his patients. Molenda fell in love with Julia Burska and they had a one-night stand in February 2019 but a mafia is following him and threatening of killing Julia and her son Tymon. Previously he was addicted to drugs and engaged to Weronika, who miscarried their child. In March 2019 he met Dominika Kwiecińska (Magdalena Gałązka), a pilot. They had a one-night stand. Dominika was later diagnosed with multiple sclerosis. He was stripped of his right to practice a profession of doctor and in October 2019 started working as a paramedic. Dominika's health is still worsening and Marcin is taking care of her. Dominika's father, Mr. Grec, is a famous public prosecutor.
 Weronika (Magdalena Celmer) is a former fiancée of Marcin Molenda. She is addicted to drugs and is continuing her treatment. She discovered that Molenda pretended the death of his patient for money and betrayed him. Weronika has a close friendship with Artur Bart and works as a charwoman in a hospital.
 Oliwia Popławska (Marta Bryła) came to Leśna Góra in 2017 in last weeks of her pregnancy. She lived in Bydgoszcz where she had a one-night stand with Adam Krajewski and fell pregnant. Oliwia met Adam and told him about their child. At the time, Adam was in love with Wiktoria Consalida and planned to marry her. Oliwia stayed in Leśna Góra and gave birth to her son, Józef Andrzej Krajewski, in October 2017. Adam died in September 2018. Oliwia is dating Paweł Gracz (Marcin Sianko), a radiologist, since late 2018. On October 2, 2019 she started her work in Leśna Góra as an electroradiology technician.
 Krzysztof Radwan (Mateusz Damięcki) is a gynaecologist who works in Leśna Góra. Radwan was married and his eight-month pregnant wife died after being injured in a car accident and eventually died. In hospital Piotr Gawryło tried to save her but he failed. Radwan was accusing Gawryło of killing his wife and had a romance with Gawryło's wife, Hana Goldberg, also a gynaecologist. Hana fell pregnant and in 2016 gave birth to Radwan's child, a son Jakub, who is being raised by Gawryło as his legal child. Radwan then had another romance with Sylwia Mróz-Dębska, a married neurosurgeon which resulted in him being seriously injured by Sylwia's husband Robert Dębski. Radwan is now single.
 Hanna Sikorka (Marta Żmuda Trzebiatowska) is an orthopaedist. She is dating Borys Jakubek since early 2019. Hanna is a daughter of Ludwik Sikorka (Artur Janusiak) and Lucyna Sikorka (Anna Samusionek). Her mother left a family for an unknown reason many years ago and came back in March 2019. Her father is in a prison as he was accused of causing a railway accident. In 2019 Lucyna took bribes from Hanna's patients in Hanna's name, leading to her daughter having serious trouble. Hanna confessed in November 2019 that she was in love in Michał Wilczewski and they started dating. Lucyna Sikorka started her work in Leśna Góra in November 2019 as a cleaner.
 Stefan Tretter (Piotr Garlicki) is a pediatric surgeon and former director of a hospital. He was dating Danuta Dębska when he was married to his first wife. When Danuta fell pregnant and wanted to tell him about that, Stefan told her that his wife was daying from cancer and ended his romance. Danuta gave birth to a stillborn son. They met again in 2000 when Stefan started working as a surgeon in Leśna Góra. Their meeting led to their second romance and subsequent wedding. Danuta suddenly died in April 2004. Stefan had a brief romance with Ewa Żak but remains single.
 Barbara Wilczewska born Król (Agnieszka Pilaszewska) is a neurosurgeon and orthopaedist who came to Leśna Góra from Szczecin in September 2018. She was diagnosed with a tumour in her brain and was operated in February 2019 by Artur Bart. After that she was a coma for a few months but recovered. In September 2019 she came back to her work. Barbara is a daughter of Cezary Król (Daniel Olbrychski). In early 2019 she met her unknown granddaughter, Matylda Smuda. Matylda and her great-grandfather Cezary share a passion for horses.
 Michał Wilczewski (Mateusz Janicki) is a surgeon who started his work in Leśna Góra in 2018. He was then engaged and met his former lover, Katarzyna Smuda. They had another romance for a few weeks and Michał learnt that Katarzyna's daughter Matylda Smuda was his biological child. Michał successfully rebuilt his relationship with his daughter, even despite her being raised by Andrzej Falkowicz. Michał is a son of Barbara Wilczewska and grandson of Cezary Król. In November 2019 he admitted that he was in love with Hanna Sikorka and they started dating.
 Agata Woźnicka (Emilia Komarnicka-Klynstra) is a internist who worked in Leśna Góra from November 2008 to November 2017 and is expecting to come back in December 2019. She studied medicine in Wrocław with Wiktoria Consalida and Przemysław Zapała. Agata was hit by a car driven by Tomasz Burski and was temporally disabled. She had brief romances with Przemysław Zapała, Witold Latoszek (it led to the break of his marriage with Milena Starska) and Marek Rogalski. Agata was married to Paweł (Maciej Marczewski) but their marriage was annulled after it was revealed that he had a legal wife in Ireland. In November 2017 she decided to make a journey around the world and quit her job. She was at the time dating Szczepan Lipski. Her unknown grandmother, Irena Aleksandrowicz (Barbara Horowianka) died at Leśna Góra hospital in November 2016 and left her her home. Agata has one brother, Hubert Woźnicki (Piotr Nowak) who have suffered from posttraumatic stress disorder after an accident in a mine. His symptoms led to a car accident in which Antonina Soszyńska and Magdalena Soszyńska were injured.
 Antoni Kos (Marcin Przybylski) is a doctor who workes in Leśna Góra since September 2019. He worked in a refugee camp in Jemen and took a girl Lina, who had a cancer, to Leśna Góra on September 18, 2019. His friend in Hanna Sikorka.
 Zdzisław, called Zdzisiek (Jakub Gąsowski) is a cleaner who workes in Leśna Góra hospital since October 2, 2019.
 Kazimiera Radlica, called Kazia (Zuzanna Lit) is a doctor who workes in Leśna Góra since October 2019. Kazia graduated from medicine in 2019. She is disabled after being injured in a car rally. She was previously dating Tadeusz Borucki. On October 2, 2019 Artur Bart invited her to start her career in Leśna Góra.
 Tadeusz Borucki (Marcin Urbanek) is a doctor who workes in Leśna Góra since October 2019. He was previously dating Kazimiera Radlica.
 Jorge (Adrian Zaremba) is a doctor who workes in Leśna Góra since October 2019. He is half-Swedish and studied medicine in Sweden. In October 2019, he started his work at ambulance with Marcin Molenda.
 Maksymilian Beger (Tomasz Ciachorowski) is a cardiac surgeon who will work in Leśna Góra from February 2020.

Former threads 
 Jakub Burski (Artur Żmijewski) is a surgeon who worked in Leśna Góra from November 1999 to February 2012. In January 2001 he married his longtime friend and former girlfriend, Zofia Stankiewicz. They had a biological daughter, Amelia Burska, in December 2001 and adopted two teenage children: Tomasz Burski (Bartosz Obuchowicz, born in 1983 in Toruń, son of Jakub and his former lover, Iwona Kozal) and Julia Burska (Sara Muldner, Aleksandra Hamkało, born 1993 as Nowak, whose parents were killed in a car accident in November 1999). In early 2000 Jakub was engaged to marry Agata Kwiecińska who miscarried their child in March 2000. Jakub is a son of Jan Burski (Krzysztof Chamiec, a professor of medicine, who died in 2001) and Barbara Burska (Barbara Brylska, a former university teacher). His parents owned a medical clinic in Boston, United States. Tomasz graduated from medicine in Warsaw and works there as a surgeon. Julia graduated from medicine in Australia and Germany and now works as an anaesthesiologist in Leśna Góra. Amelia was born with a heart defect and lives with her parents in Berlin, Germany and Boston, United States.
 Wiktoria Manuela Consalida (Katarzyna Dąbrowska) is a talented and ambitious surgeon who worked in Leśna Góra from November 2008 to October 2019. She is half-Spanish. Her mother is Wanda Consalida and her father is Spanish. Wiktoria studied medicine in Wrocław and came to Leśna Góra with her then boyfriend, Przemysław Zapała. They split after it was revealed that Wiktora gave birth to a daughter, Blanka Consalida, when she was 16 and that girl was raised as Wiktoria's sister. Consalida then had brief relationships with Piotr Gawryło and Andrzej Falkowicz. In September 2018 her fiance, Adam Krajewski, died after saving her life when they were drowning in a lake. In 2019 Wiktoria met her childhood friend, Jose Rodriguez Perez, a professor of medicine and went to Spain to attend the funeral of her grandmother. She inherited grandmother's house and in October 2019 she decided to quit her work in Leśna Góra and move to Spain with Rodriguez to start her new life. In 2021 she gave birth to fratelnal twins in Spain, named Pedro Rodriguez Consalida and Adam Rodriguez Consalida (named after Adam Krajewski).
 Hana Goldberg (Kamilla Baar-Kochańska) was a gynaecologist and neonatologist who worked in Leśna Góra from June 2011 to 2014. She was a daughter of Julian Zapała and his Israelian lover but was raised as a legal daughter of Mr. Goldberg. She had four maternal half-sisters and a paternal half-brother, Przemysław Zapała. She was raised in Israel and came to Leśna Góra in June 2011 to meet her brother. She started her work as a gynecologist there. Goldberg fell in love with Piotr Gawryło and they had a romance. They eventually married but their marriage was broken off due to arrive of James Caldwell, Hana's husband who was believed to be dead. James tried to reconcile with Hana but he suffered from mental illness. Hana had another romance with her friend, Krzysztof Radwan. She fell pregnant and convinced Piotr that she was carrying his child. In 2016 in Tel Aviw she gave birth to her son, Jakub Gawryło. On November 11, 2016 Hana died in a car accident. Piotr went to Israel to take his son to Poland and learnt that Jakub was Radwan's biological child. Mira Goldberg is a sister of Hana, she is a doctor and lives in Israel. Sara Mandel (Magdalena Schejbal) is another sister of Hana; she is a gynaecologist and lived in United States where she was married to a professor named Mandel. Sara worked in Leśna Góra from December 2016 to January 2018. Sara helped Piotr with raising her nephew. In early 2018 Piotr and Jakub moved to Israel.
 Michał Kalita (Leon Niemczyk) was a widowed father of Elżbieta Walicka. He married Gabriela Krukowska (Emilia Krakowska) on November 5, 2000. His daughter died in December 2002. He had three grandchildren. Gabriela was a close friend of Burski family and a nanny of Jakub Burski. For many years she lived with them in Boston, United States. She came back to Poland with Jakub Burski in November 1999 as he planned to sell his house and move to Boston permanently. He changed his plans after meeting his unknown son, Tomasz Kozal. Gabriela met Michał when he visited Jakub Burski in Leśna Góra.
 Agata Kwiecińska-Depczyk (Dorota Segda) was a financial director of Leśna Góra hospital from November 1999 to 2005. In late 1999 she had a romance with Jakub Burski which resulted in her pregnancy. Jakub, being in love with Zofia Stankiewicz, was ready to propose to Agata and start a family with her, but Agata miscarried in March 2000 and they split. She was then dating an internist, Dariusz Depczyk (Marek Barbasiewicz) and his son, Maciej Depczyk (Krzysztof Zawadzki). She eventually married Maciej, a lawyer, and after some problems with mafia they moved abroad.
 Zofia Stankiewicz-Burska (Małgorzata Foremniak) is an anaesthesiologist who worked in Leśna Góra from November 1999 to November 2012. She was born in Krosno. Her father was Andrzej Stankiewicz (Michał Grudziński) and her mother died after learning about her husband's romance. For some time Zofia lived in Cracow where she was married and then divorced. She got engaged to a musician Mikołaj Mellado (Robert Janowski) and moved to Leśna Góra to live with him. There she met her close friends, Jakub Burski and Bruno Walicki and decided to work at a local hospital. Mikołaj turned out to be a gay and they split. Zofia planned to adopt Julia Nowak, a girl whose parents were killed in a car accident in November 1999. Stankiewicz eventually married Jakub Burski in January 2001, adopted Julia and Jakub's teenage son, Tomasz Kozal. She was believed to be infertile but in 2001 she fell pregnant and gave birth to her daughter Amelia Burska. In April 2005 she was diagnosed with Hodgkin's lymphoma and now is in a remission. In 2003 she met her younger sister, Małgorzata Donovan (Maja Ostaszewska) who emigrated to Australia with their father. Andrzej Stankiewicz was in a prison accused of tax fraud. Zofia reconciled with Małgorzata, they released Stankiewicz and invited him to Poland. Andrzej met his children and grandchildren. He died in February 2007 after a long illness. Małgorzata Donovan was married to Robert Donovan who suffered from depression. Their marriage was in trouble but they later reconciled and Donovan gave birth to their child, Igor Donovan, on April 27, 2008.
 Bruno Walicki (Krzysztof Pieczyński) is a surgeon who worked in Leśna Góra from November 1999 to February 2004 and for some time was hospital's director. He was married to Elżbieta Walicka (Ewa Skibińska) and they had two children: Agnieszka Walicka (Karolina Borkowska) and Paweł Walicki (Jan Prosiński). In December 2002, while pregnant with their third child, Elżbieta was hit by a car and died hours after giving birth to their son, Stanisław Walicki. Bruno then had a relationship with Monika Zybert and planned to marry her but then changed his mind and left Monika unaware that she was pregnant with their child. Walicki moved to Stockholm, Sweden and married there a Swedish doctor. He has never met his daughter, Hanna Zybert, who was born in 2004 and is raised as a legal child of Monika's husband, Krzysztof Jędras. Agnieszka was dating Tomasz Burski, son of Jakub and Zofia, for a few years but they split when Agnieszka hasn't passed a secondary school certificate and decided to move to United States. There she had a romance with and older, married man named Paul. She fell pregnant but aborted her child. Agnieszka came back to Poland and discovered that Hanna was her half-sister. As of now, Bruno, Agnieszka, Paweł and Stanisław live in Sweden.
 Przemysław Zapała (Marcin Rogacewicz) is a surgeon who worked in Leśna Góra from November 2008 to September 2018. He is a son of Julian and Małgorzata Zapała and had a paternal half-sister, Hana Goldberg, whom he met in June 2011. Przemysław graduated from medicine in Wrocław in 2008 and started his work in Leśna Góra. At the time, he was dating Wiktoria Consalida. They split in 2010 when Przemysław learnt that Wiktoria had a teenaged daughter, Blanka Consalida. Then he was in a relationship with Ludmiła Papierniak (Paulina Chruściel), a painter. She was diagnosed with a brain cancer. Ludmiła died on October 17, 2012 in Haifa, Israel, after a surgery, leaving Przemysław in a mourning. Zapała had a one-night stand with Aleksandra Pietrzak which resulted in a pregnancy. His daughter Franciszka Zapała was born on April 30, 2014 in Leśna Góra. In September 2018 Przemysław moved to Sweden with Aleksandra and her two children.
 Tadeusz Zybert (Marian Opania) is a surgeon and professor medicine who worked in Leśna Góra from November 1999 to March 2017. For many years he was a hospital's director. Tadeusz was widowed and had a one daughter, Monika Zybert-Jędras (Jolanta Fraszyńska). Monika graduated from medicine in 1999 and started her work in Leśna Góra as an internist. She was interested in psychiatry. Monika was dating Mikołaj Mellado and then Bruno Walicki. She fell pregnant by Bruno but didn't tell him about that because he decided to leave her and move to Stockholm, Sweden. Zybert gave birth to her daughter Hanna Zybert on October 31, 2004 in Leśna Góra. On September 11, 2009 she married Krzysztof Jędras (Andrzej Bienias), an orthopaedist who adopted her child. Tadeusz was diagnosed with Parkinson's disease and had a short romance with his widowed sister-in-law, Klara Zybert (Magdalena Zawadzka). Their romance ended when it was revealed that Klara was taking bribes from Tadeusz's patients.

List of main characters' departures

References

External links
 
 

1999 Polish television series debuts
Polish television soap operas
Polish medical television series
1990s Polish television series
2000s Polish television series
2010s Polish television series
2020s Polish television series
Telewizja Polska original programming